The Focolare Movement is an international organization that promotes the ideals of unity and universal brotherhood. Founded in Trent, northern Italy, in 1943 by Chiara Lubich as a Catholic movement, it remains largely Roman Catholic but has strong links to the major Christian denominations and other religions, or in some cases with the non-religious.

The Focolare Movement operates in 180 nations and has over 140,440 members. The word "Focolare" is Italian for "hearth" or "family fireside". While Focolare is the common sobriquet given to this organisation, its official name when approved in 1990 as an International Association of the Faithful of Pontifical Right, was "Work of Mary".

Beginnings 
In the Northern Italian city of Trent in 1943, in the climate of violence and hatred of the Second World War, the young elementary school teacher Chiara Lubich saw God's love as the only antidote when civil life was crumbling around her. With her Bible in hand while sheltering during air raids, she claimed she felt deeply Jesus' desire "that they all may be one." A group sharing her vision joined in helping those in the shelters and in the poorest parts of town, and numbers grew. In 1948, the journalist Igino Giordani, a member of Parliament and pioneer of ecumenism, joined the group, bringing his ideal of social unity. Another co-founder was Fr. Pasquale Foresi with his theological background, and founder of New City Press in 1964.

Focolare initially spread in Italy and Europe, then worldwide: South America (1958), North America (1961), Africa (1963), Asia (1966), and Australia (1967).

Focolare towns 
After 1949, summer vacations together in Fiera di Primiero in the Dolomite Mountains led to the desire to share – materially, culturally, and spiritually. Numbers increased for these retreats, including priests and religious with a variety of spiritualities, and by 1955 this gathering took on the name "Mariapolis", a model of peace for the world under Mother Mary's patronage. In 1962 Chiara's visit to the Benedictine Einsiedeln Abbey in Switzerland made her dream of permanent towns of brother/sisterhood, "simple houses, workplaces, schools – just like an ordinary town."  In 1964 Loppiano, the first permanent Mariapolis was built on land donated by Vincenzo Folonari, near Florence. It has grown to include 900 people of worldwide origins and diverse occupations, married and single, priests and religious, who work and study together and strive to live in exemplary Christian charity. Each year an average of 40,000 visitors pass through Loppiano.

According to the movement twenty four other such towns have sprung up worldwide. Some have specific emphases: ecumenism (Ottmaring, Germany; Welwyn Garden City, Great Britain); ecology (Rotselaar, Belgium); interreligious dialogue (Tagaytay, Philippines); multi-ethnic harmony (Luminosa, New York; Križevci, Croatia); or inculturation (Fontem, Cameroon; Kenya; Ivory Coast). In these towns religious and cultural differences are respected, to exemplify Jesus' dream: "Father, may they all be one, as you and I are one."

Development
The president of the Focolare Movement, who is always a lay woman, is Maria Voce, first elected in 2008. The chief goals of the movement are: to cooperate in the consolidation of unity in the Christian world, with individuals and groups, movements, and associations; to contribute to full communion with Christians of different churches; and to work towards universal brother/sisterhood of all peoples, regardless of religious beliefs.

The movement has branched out to address a variety of groups including families, youth, and different religions. Special projects have sprung up within the movement, such as the "Abba" school, Young People for a United World (now Youth for a United World), Teens4unity, Economy of Communion (involving 800 companies), evangelism within small cities, social work, the Igino Giordani Centre, and 27 publishing houses. Pope Francis in praising Economy of Communion called on it to change "the rules of the game of the socio-economic system." John L. Allen Jr. has observed that it is hard to "pick a fight with a focolarino. ...They tend to be open, ego-free, and just relentlessly nice."

Focolare has 140,440 members in more than 180 countries. People more broadly involved in the movement are estimated by the Vatican at 4.5 million.

Renewal
At a reorganizational meeting in 2014 newly elected council members had an average age 16 years younger than that of the previous council, and the 30 council members came from 20 different countries. In Pope Francis' address to the reorganizational meeting, he said: "The Work of Mary, that everyone knows as the Focolare movement, was a little seed in the Catholic Church’s womb, that in the course of the years has brought to life a tree which now extends its branches in all the expressions of the Christian family and also among members of different religions and among many who cultivate justice and solidarity together with the search for truth." Francis went on to describe elements of the movement as contemplation, going out to engage in dialogue and formation of youth. Of contemplation he said: “We need to contemplate God and the beauty of his love,” keeping in mind that “to contemplate means to live together with brothers and sisters, breaking with them the bread of communion and fraternity,” since “contemplation that leaves people outside is a lie, it is narcissism.”

Publications
New City Press, established in 1964, is the official publishing house for the Focolare movement, publishing books, periodicals, and e-books. Among its publications are the Spirituality of Unity series, featuring the works of founder Chiara Lubich, and Understanding the Scriptures, Bible commentaries by scholars such as Daniel J. Harrington, Dianne Bergant, Robert Karris, and Ronald Witherup. NCP publications include: the academic journal Sophia twice a year; three quarterlies – Gen's on ecclesial commitment as well as New Humanity, and Unity and Charisms; the bimonthly Teens for children; and the monthly periodicals Città Nuova (published in 38 different national or regional formats; known as New City in the UK, and as Living City in the US) with opinion and dialogue, Big Smart Kids including inserts for educators, and Gospel of the Day.

Focolare also produces Economy of Communion quarterly and website.

Members proposed for Sainthood

Blesseds
 Chiara Badano [Luce] – (1971–1990), Young Layperson of the Diocese of Aqui Terme; Member (Italy)

Venerables
 Jerzy Ciesielski – (1929–1970), Married Layperson of Archdiocese of Kraków; Member (Poland-Egypt)
 Maria Orsola Bussone – (1954–1970), Young Layperson of Archdiocese of Turin; Member (Italy)
 Daniela Zanetta – (1962–1986), Young Layperson of the Diocese of Novara; Member (Italy); declared "Venerable": 23 March 2017
 Nguyễn Văn Thuận – (1928–2002), Bishop of Nha Trang; Cardinal; Associate (Vietnam-Italy)

Servants of God
 Chiara Lubich [Silvia] – (1920–2008), Layperson of the Diocese of Frascati; Founder of the Focolare Movement
 Igino Giordani [Foco] – (1894–1980), Married Layperson of the Diocese of Frascati; Cofounder (Italy)
 Albertina Violi Zirondoli – (1901–1972), Married Layperson of the Diocese of Fiesole; Consecrated Member (Italy)
 Alberto Michelotti – (1958–1980), Young Layperson of the Archdiocese of Genoa; Member (Italy)
 Carlo Grisolia [Vir] – (1960–1980), Young Layperson of the Archdiocese of Genoa; Member (Italy)
 Maria Cecilia Perrin de Buide – (1957–1985), Married Layperson of the Archdiocese of Bahia Blanca; Member (Argentina)
 Margarita Bavosi [Luminosa] – (1941–1985), Layperson of the Archdiocese of Madrid; Consecrated Member (Argentina-Italy)
 Renata Borlone – (1930–1990), Layperson of the Diocese of Fiesole; Consecrated Member (Italy)
  – (1968–1991), Young Layperson of the Diocese of Bari-Bitonto; Associate; Martyr (Italy)
 Dario Porta – (1930–1996), Priest of the Diocese of Parma; Member (Italy)
 Manuel Pascual Perrin – (1925–2000), Married Layperson of the Archdiocese of Bahia Blanca; Member (Argentina)
  – (1918–2001), Layperson of the Diocese of Osasco; Consecrated Member (Italy-Brazil)
 Domenico Antonio Mangano – (1938–2001), Married Layperson of the Diocese of Albano; Member of the Volunteers of God – Focolare Movement (Italy)

References

Bibliography

External links

 Living City Magazine magazine published by the Focolare
 Pag-asa Social Center Foundation Inc one of the social expressions of the Focolare

Organizations established in 1943
International associations of the faithful